Heliophyllum is an extinct genus of corals that existed predominantly in the Devonian. Heliophyllum is of the order Rugosa and can be referred to as horn corals. The genus had a wide distribution. Fossils of H. halli have been found in the fossil rich Floresta Formation of the Altiplano Cundiboyacense, Colombia. This genus used its nematocysts to stun prey.

References

Bibliography 
 

Rugosa
Prehistoric Hexacorallia genera
Devonian animals of Africa
Devonian animals of Asia
Devonian animals of North America
Devonian animals of South America
Devonian Colombia
Fossils of Colombia
Fossil taxa described in 1846
Paleozoic life of Ontario
Floresta Formation
Paleozoic life of the Northwest Territories